Kenneth Howard Brown (March 9, 1936 – February 5, 2022) was an American playwright and novelist. His play, The Brig, won three Obie Awards. It was adapted into film by Jonas Mekas.

Background
Brown was born in New York City, New York in Brooklyn, and served in the United States Marine Corps. Brown went to Columbia University and was a bartender; He died on February 5, 2022, at the age of 85 in New York City in a hospice in the Queens from cancer.<ref>Daily Expert News (DEN).''' Nick Erickson, February 7, 2002, 'Kenneth H. Brown, playwright best known for 'The Brig' dies aged 85'</ref> His papers are held at the Harry Ransom Center at the University of Texas at Austin.

PlaysThe BrigNightlightBooksThe NarrowsHitler’s Analysts''

References

External links

 
1936 births
2022 deaths
20th-century American dramatists and playwrights
American male novelists
Military personnel from New York City
United States Marines
Columbia University alumni
Writers from Brooklyn
American bartenders
Deaths from cancer in New York (state)